{{Speciesbox
| image = SeitzFaunaAfricanaXIIITaf69.JPG
| image_caption = Seitz ..Fauna Africana Taf69 (line e)
| image2 = 
| taxon = Cigaritis somalina
| authority = (Butler, 1886)
| synonyms =Spindasis somalina Butler, 1886
}}Cigaritis somalina, the Somali silverline, is a butterfly in the family Lycaenidae. It is found in Yemen, Ethiopia, Somalia and northern Kenya. The habitat consists of arid savanna, often along water courses.

Adults are attracted to flowers at the edge of irrigated fields.

The larvae possibly feed on Acacia species.

References

External links
Die Gross-Schmetterlinge der Erde 13: Die Afrikanischen Tagfalter. Plate XIII 69 e''

Butterflies described in 1886
Cigaritis
Butterflies of Africa
Taxa named by Arthur Gardiner Butler